Cymatium femorale is a species of predatory sea snail in the family Cymatiidae.

Description
The maximum recorded shell length is 212 mm.

Habitat
The minimum recorded depth is 0.6 m. The maximum recorded depth is 150 m.

References

Cymatiidae
Taxa named by Carl Linnaeus
Gastropods described in 1758